Ion Györffi (born 25 November 1949) is a Romanian boxer. He competed in the men's light middleweight event at the 1972 Summer Olympics.

References

External links

1949 births
Living people
Romanian male boxers
Olympic boxers of Romania
Boxers at the 1972 Summer Olympics
Sportspeople from Bucharest
Light-middleweight boxers